GEC or Gec may refer to:

Education 

 Gedo Education Committee, in Somalia
 Glen Eira College, in  Caulfield East, Victoria, Australia
 Goa Engineering College, India
 Government Engineering College (disambiguation)
 Guild for Exceptional Children, in New York City, US
 Gwalior Engineering College, India

Other uses 
 Aleksandar Gec (1928–2008), Serbian basketball player
 General Electric Company, a former British engineering conglomerate
 General entertainment channel, a type of TV or radio channel
 Global Environment Centre, Malaysia
 Golden Empire Council, of the Boy Scouts of America
 Gran Enciclopèdia Catalana, a Catalan-language encyclopedia
 Greater Egyptian Conference, an athletics conference in Illinois, US
 Green Electronics Council, US
 Grêmio Esportivo Catanduvense, a former Brazilian football club
 Grounding electrode conductor
 Lufthansa Cargo, a German cargo airline, ICAO code
 Mount GEC, in Jasper National Park, Canada
 100 Gecs, a musical group
 1000 Gecs, the 2019 debut studio album by 100 Gecs